John Hennessey (birth unknown – death unknown) was a Welsh professional rugby league footballer who played in the 1920s.

International honours
John Hennessey won a cap for Wales while at Rochdale Hornets in 1925.

References

Place of birth missing
Place of death missing
Rochdale Hornets players
Rugby league second-rows
Wales national rugby league team players
Welsh rugby league players
Year of birth missing
Year of death missing